Robert Weil may refer to:
 Robert Weil (businessman) (born 1948), Swedish entrepreneur and philanthropist
 Robert Weil (writer) (1881–1950), Austrian playwright and screenwriter
 Robert Weil (editor), American magazine editor and publisher
 Robert Schoenhof Weil (1919–2016), American businessman and philanthropist